The central bearded dragon (Pogona vitticeps), also known as the inland bearded dragon, is a species of agamid lizard found in a wide range of arid to semiarid regions of eastern and central Australia.

Taxonomy
Pogona vitticeps was first described by German zoologist Ernst Ahl in 1926, who placed it in the genus Amphibolurus.

Description

Some sexual dimorphism is present: males can be distinguished from females by a wider cloacal opening, a wider base of the tail, a larger head and beard, and the possession of hemipenes. Males also have more pronounced femoral pores than females (these can be seen as waxy bumps on the underside of the back legs). Bearded dragons vary widely in colour, including brown, reddish-brown, red, yellow, white and orange. They are capable of undergoing moderate changes in coloration, and scales along both sides of the throat, neck, and head form a row of narrow spines that runs down each side of the body to the tail. When feeling threatened, a bearded dragon will flatten its body against the ground, puff out its spiny throat and open its jaws to make itself appear larger. The bearded dragon is so named because of the pouch-like projection (also called the guttural pouch) on the underside of the neck and chin area which typically turns darker than the rest of the body. It also boasts spiny projections. Both of these characteristics appear similar to a human's beard. Males typically have a darker "beard" than females, and during mating season and courtship it will typically darken to near-black. The bearded dragon, like most agamid lizards, has strong legs which enable it to lift its body completely off the ground while it moves. This is done to reduce the heat taken in from the ground, as well as to increase the air flow over the belly to cool itself further.

A study conducted in 2014 established the existence of endogenous circadian rhythm in pigmentation changes in P. vitticeps. If exposed to light, the dorsal skin of the lizard becomes darker, and if exposed to darkness, it becomes lighter. Under constant darkness (i.e. in the subjective night), the lizards' dorsal skin becomes the lightest.

Many species of Pogona have a parietal eye (there are many names for it), a photoreceptor found on the center of the head. This photoreceptor is responsible for thermoregulation and hormone regulation. A study in March 2020 on the Central Bearded Dragon found that light-dependent magnetoreception occurs when light with a wavelength under 580 nanometers enters the parietal eye.

Ecology and behaviour

P. vitticeps is native to the semiarid woodland, arid woodland, and rocky desert regions of Central Australia. They are skilled climbers and often spend just as much time perching on tree limbs, fence posts, and in bushes as they do on the ground. They spend the morning and early evening sunning themselves on exposed branches or rocks, and retreat to shady areas or burrows during the hottest parts of the afternoon.

Bearded dragons do not vocalize, except to hiss softly when threatened. Instead, they communicate through colour displays, posture, and physical gestures, such as arm waving and head bobbing. Bearded dragons are not social animals, but will sometimes gather in groups, especially in popular feeding or basking areas. At these times, a distinct hierarchy will emerge: the highest-ranking animals will take the best – usually the highest or sunniest – basking spots, and all other individuals arrange themselves lower down. If a low-ranking animal tries to challenge one of the dominant dragons, the dominant animal will demonstrate its superiority by bobbing its head and inflating its beard, at which point the challenger may signal submission by waving one of its arms in a slow or fast circle. If the low-ranking dragon does not submit, it will return the head bob, and a standoff or fight may ensue.

The head bob gestures are:

Slow bowing motion – often used by adult females to signal submission to a male
Fast bob – used by males to signal dominance (often accompanied by an inflated and/or blackened beard)
Violent bob – used by males just before mating; much more vigorous, and usually sets the animal's whole body in motion
Both males and females will occasionally do fast and violent head bobs, which shows they are stressed out and need to be isolated.

The male will only wave to show submission to a dominant male, whereas the female will wave, followed by a slow head bob, to show she is ready to mate. Gravid females will often refuse the advances of a male by chasing him and lying on his back.

When under direct attack, the central bearded dragon opens its mouth to display its yellow membranes and extend its beard. It darkens the colour of its skin and flattens its body, and will hiss and make small jumps towards the attacker. Bearded dragons are not known to attack humans.

Adult male bearded dragons can bite more forcefully than adult females and this difference is associated with greater head dimensions.

Bearded dragons have been shown to be able to learn from watching the behaviour of conspecifics. An experiment demonstrated that after one individual was trained to open a door to reach a food item, most other bearded dragons watching this action were able to perform it as well.

Reproduction

The age of sexual maturity has not been measured, although it is estimated to be about one or two years. Body size and growth rates are more important than age when determining sexual maturity in bearded dragons. Males will become very aggressive towards each other and will assert their dominance by inflating their beards and through fast head bobbing. Breeding typically occurs in the early spring. Females will lay a clutch of 11–30 oblong-shaped eggs in a shallow nest dug in the sand. After being laid, the eggs are buried and are left unattended. The eggs will hatch approximately 60 to 80 days later, depending on the incubation temperature. In captivity, they can be incubated in a styrofoam fish box, but without a male lizard, the female's eggs will not be fertile. However, a female bearded dragon can retain sperm, and thus produce fertile eggs even after being separated from a male.

Courtship involves the male "head bobbing" to display dominance. If the female displays submissive behaviour, the male will use his mouth to grab the back of the female's head and the male will also wrap his front legs around the female's upper torso to keep her from moving. Copulation and insemination are quick. The gestation period averages about a month and a half.

Thermally induced sex reversal
A 2015 study showed that high-temperature incubation of eggs transforms genetically male individuals into functional females. Normally their sex is determined genetically. Males have ZZ sex chromosomes, females ZW. However, when their eggs are incubated at temperatures above 32 °C (90 °F) some genetic males are born female. These females are fertile, sometimes producing more eggs than the ZW females. As juveniles, the sex reversed ZZ females resemble ZZ males with respect to relative tail length and boldness. However, as adults sex-reversed ZZ females lack the larger head and greater bite force of ZZ males and more closely resemble ZW  females.

Captive breeding

Several of the Pogona genus are bred in captivity as pets; the two most popular are this species and the Rankin's dragon (Pogona henrylawsoni). The bulk of captive-bred bearded dragons today are thought to have originated from stock illegally exported from Australia during the 1970s.

Captives worldwide are threatened by Agamid adenovirus, a virus that compromises the immune system of the dragon, and leads to death from other diseases. However, the majority of the infections are subclinical. Subclinically infected animals show no symptoms, but are active carriers of the disease and will infect other bearded dragons. Pet bearded dragons are commonly susceptible to Metabolic Bone Disease due to a lack of calcium in the diet, as well as impactions from ingesting sand or insects that are too large for their mouth.

When the female is ready to lay eggs, she will generally stop eating, and spend most of her time trying to dig.

A morph with underdeveloped dorsal scales is popular as a terrarium pet under the name of "leatherback bearded dragon".

References

Further reading
 

Pogona
Agamid lizards of Australia
Reptiles described in 1926
Taxa named by Ernst Ahl
Reptiles as pets